Rino Rappuoli is head of vaccine research and development (R&D) at GlaxoSmithKline (GSK) Vaccines. Previously, he has served as visiting scientist at Rockefeller University and Harvard Medical School and held roles at Sclavo, Vaccine Research and CSO, Chiron Corporation, and Novartis Vaccines.

Education
Rappuoli earned his doctoral and bachelor's degrees in biological sciences at the University of Siena.

Career and research
He is known globally for his work in vaccines and immunology. He co-founded the field of cellular microbiology, a discipline combining cell biology and microbiology, and pioneered the genomic approach to vaccine development known as reverse vaccinology, a subsection of reverse pharmacology.

Rappuoli led Chiron Corporation's development of adjuvanted influenza vaccines, MENJUGATE(R) conjugate vaccine against meningococcal-C disease and the first recombinant bacterial vaccine against pertussis. Currently, Rappuoli is actively involved in the research and development of further vaccines against meningococcal disease and avian and pandemic influenza.

Rappuoli joined Chiron as head of European vaccines research in 1992 with the acquisition of Italian vaccines company Sclavo SpA, where he served as head of research and development. Rappuoli, was previously the global head of vaccines research for Novartis Vaccines & Diagnostics (Siena, Italy) Since 2015, Dr. Rappuoli serves as the chief scientist and head of external R&D at the vaccines division of GlaxoSmithKline and is based in Siena, Italy.

Major achievements include development of CRM197 used in Haemophilus influenzae, Neisseria meningitidis, and pneumococcus vaccines; an acellular pertussis vaccine containing a genetically detoxified pertussis toxin; the first conjugate vaccines against meningococcus; MF59 adjuvant for influenza; the meningococcus B genome-derived vaccine.

During his career, he has introduced several novel scientific concepts: genetic detoxification in 1987; cellular microbiology in 1996; reverse vaccinology in 2000; pan-genome in 2005.

Honors and awards
Rappuoli is the recipient of several prestigious awards, including the Paul Ehrlich and Ludwig Darmstaedter Prize in 1991. He is a member of numerous international associations, including the European Molecular Biology Organization and the American Society for Microbiology. He was also awarded the Italian President Gold Medal in 2005 and the Albert Sabin Gold Medal in 2009. In 2013 he was nominated third most influential person worldwide in the field of vaccines by Terrapin. In 2015 he was awarded Fellowship of Imperial College London Faculty of Medicine and the Maurice Hilleman Award.

In 2016 he was elected a Foreign Member of the Royal Society.

In 2017 he received the European Inventor Award 2017 in the category of "Lifetime achievement" by the European Patent Office. In 2019 he was awarded the Robert Koch Prize.

References

Living people
Members of the European Molecular Biology Organization
University of Siena alumni
American immunologists
Influenza researchers
Harvard Medical School faculty
Rockefeller University faculty
Vaccinologists
Foreign associates of the National Academy of Sciences
Foreign Members of the Royal Society
1952 births